Mullaghmore is a village on the Mullaghmore Peninsula in County Sligo, Ireland. It is a holiday destination with a skyline dominated by Benbulben mountain. It is in the barony of Carbury and parish of Ahamlish.

History
From the 17th to the 19th centuries it was part of the large estate belonging to the Temple family in north Sligo. Sir John's direct descendant, The 3rd Viscount Palmerston (1784-1865), began the building of Classiebawn Castle on the peninsula, a baronial-style house designed by James Rawson Carroll. Lord Palmerston also built the stone-walled harbour in the village, which was designed by the marine engineer Alexander Nimmo. It was built between 1822 and 1841.

The Temples were mostly absentee landlords, with the estate being run initially by middlemen, and later by land agents, such as Stewart and Kincaid, a Dublin firm with offices in Sligo. These agents, in their attempts to make the estates profitable, oversaw the "assisted emigration" that took place on the Palmerston and adjacent Gore-Booth (Lissadell) estate that began before the Great Famine and continued until at least the 1860s.

Thus, in May 1862, a Sligo newspaper reported: "In accordance with a custom of some years' standing, about sixty persons have been selected for emigration from the Parish of Ahamlish ... whose passages and outfit has been provided by his Lordship. They consist of twenty-four young girls, and twenty young men ... [and] families who were wholly unable to support themselves ... who had asked the favour of being sent out ... The emigrants took their passages ... this day, for Liverpool, en route for America."

Lord Palmerston presided over Mullaghmore and North Sligo during the worst years of the Great Famine of the mid-19th century. During the summer and autumn of 1847, nine vessels, carrying over 2,000 persons left Sligo port with tenants evicted and "shovelled out" from his Sligo estates. They arrived in Canada half-naked and totally destitute. The city of St. John in the Canadian province of New Brunswick had to take many of Palmerston's evicted tenants into care and, outraged, sent a scathing letter to Palmerston expressing regret and fury that he or his agents, ‘should have exposed such a numerous and distressed portion of his tenantry to the severity and privation of a New Brunswick winter ... unprovided with the common means of support, with broken-down constitutions and almost in a state of nudity ... without regard to humanity or even common decency.’ The graves of many of these unfortunate victims can be seen today on the old quarantine station, now a museum, at Grosse Ille near Quebec. 

Classiebawn was a favoured holiday retreat of Admiral of the Fleet Louis Mountbatten. It was off the Mullaghmore coast in August 1979 that Mountbatten, along with his fourteen-year-old grandson Nicholas Knatchbull, Doreen Knatchbull and County Fermanagh teenager Paul Maxwell, were killed by a bomb planted by the Provisional IRA.

In 2007 it hosted the final stage of Rally Ireland. Sebastian Loeb wins the Rally of Ireland and went on to win his 4th World Championship title.

Surfing

Mullaghmore is a big wave surfing destination.

The waves in Mullaghmore were generated by a complex weather system nicknamed the "Viking storm" leading to big wave conditions in the area for the month of March for 15 years. Some riders suffered bruising as well as broken bones and surfboards.

A North American low-pressure system moved east and combined with another cyclone in the Western Atlantic. This system moved into an area off the coast of Ireland that already had high waves owing to a series of strong systems the previous week. In addition, a strong anticyclone over the Azores created a large pressure gradient in the North Atlantic that directed a strong fetch towards Ireland. There was also an extended fetch length in the North Atlantic in the direction of Europe while the swell was created. These combined conditions produced waves that were confirmed by satellite data on 7 March 2012 to have exceeded  in height.

Amenities

Mullaghmore is served by two hotels, a seafood restaurant, a grocery shop, a spiritual retreat centre and a fish farm. There is also a variety of B&Bs in Mullaghmore. Mullaghmore's busiest times for trade and tourism are during the summer months of May, June, July and August, with the busiest being the weekend of the 12th of July, and the August Bank Holiday weekend. Most of these businesses close for the winter months, except the fish farm.

There is no lifeguard on duty.

The Pier Head Hotel, Spa and Leisure Centre 
The Pier Head Hotel is situated in Mullaghmore village by the Pier wall. It opened as McHugh's Hotel & Tearooms in the early twentieth century, while also housing a schoolhouse. It is still owned by the McHugh family. In 2005, the hotel oversaw major renovations, including the addition of more rooms, a heated pool, a spa, and a new restaurant. In 2007, it was rally HQ when the final stage in the Rally Ireland stages got underway. In 2010, Leonard Cohen stayed at the Pier Head Hotel, after a request by the Hotel staff. Cohen wanted to stay outside Sligo town and opted for Mullaghmore. He also liked to walk the Beach and meander around the village. He stayed at the Pier Head while he performed two gigs in Sligo in front of 20,000 people at Lissadell House in his  2010 tour which he said was one of his two favourite venues he has ever played at. In 2015, The Pier Head hosted Charles, Prince of Wales, and his wife Camilla, Duchess of Cornwall, on their official visit to Mullaghmore where his uncle was killed. The Pier Head Hotel held a brief history exhibition on the area's history for Prince Charles and his wife.  The Hotel now has over 40 rooms, Nimmo's residents bar, named after the designer of the Harbour, and a restaurant named The Clashybann Restaurant overlooking Donegal Bay. As of July 2022, The restaurant is open to the public. The leisure centre is open to the public, as is the Quay Bar.

The Beach Hotel 
The Beach Hotel is situated across the road from the Pier Head, overlooking the harbour. It was first opened in the 1950s and has enjoyed prolonged business in Mullaghmore. It was once popular with showbands. In the late 1990s, the Hotel added Corki's Niteclub and a leisure centre, which included a 15-metre pool, gym and a jacuzzi. In 2015, the  Hotel was featured in Episode 6 of Series 7 of RTÉ's At Your Service, where hoteliers Francis Brennan and his brother John set out to help lift the hotel and give it more business. The plan drawn up by the hoteliers included renovation of the rooms, a renovation to the function room, and a rebranding of the hotel. The Leisure remained was decommissioned entirely, due to the small budget of the owners. The results turned around the fortunes of the Hotel and the hotel is thriving to this day. The hotel now has 28 rooms, a resident's restaurant, and the Boatmans Bistro Bar, which is open to the public.

Eithna's By the Sea Seafood Restaurant 
Eithna's By The Sea is an award-winning seafood restaurant in Mullaghmore situated beside the beach Hotel and across from the Pier Head Hotel. It was first opened in 1990. Chef Neven Maguire once visited Eithna's Restaurant on the Sligo leg of his Irish Seafood Trails programme which was broadcast on RTÉ in 2019  The restaurant is also notable for its striking mural depicting "By The Sea in Mullaghmore"

Paddy's Place
Paddy's Place is the only shop for 5km, the next nearest shop being in Cliffoney. It is open from March through to October and closes at 6 pm each day. It sells groceries, ice creams, and beach toys and equipment.

Star Of The Sea Retreat and Conference Centre 
The Star Of the Sea Building originally housed the coast guard in the nineteenth century, and the Sligo Sisters Of Mercy made it their home in August of 1929. In the 1970s, the Convent began to welcome retreats. The entire building was overhauled and renovated in the 1990s. In 2010, The Mullaghmore Peace Garden was the latest addition to the facility. In 2015, the garden was visited by Prince Charles. In 2013, the Convent was handed over by the Sisters of the Western Province to the Bishop of Elphin and was run by God. Sr. Kathleen Rooney, R.S.M.. She ran the retreat until August 2020 when she was replaced by Louise and Frank McGuinness, who are the current management team at the Centre.

Transport
The village is served by TFI Local Link Route 982, which runs from Ballyshannon to Sligo. The bus arrives at Mullaghmore five times per day Monday to Saturday, and three times per day on Sunday. For long-distance routes, the nearest Bus Éireann stop is at Cliffoney, around  distant, and is served several times per day.

Notable people
 Joe McGowan (b. 1944), historian and author

Gallery

See also
 List of towns and villages in Ireland
 Surfing in Ireland
 Wild Atlantic Way
 Visitor Guide to Mullaghmore

References

External links
Profile of an Irish Village: Palmerston and the Conquest, Colonisation and Evolution of Mullaghmore, Co. Sligo

Towns and villages in County Sligo
Beaches of County Sligo
Surfing locations in Ireland